San Vittore del Lazio is a comune (municipality) in the Province of Frosinone in the Italian region Lazio, located about  southeast of Rome and about  southeast of Frosinone.

The castle of San Vittore has belonged to the Mancini family from the 15th century to the present.

San Vittore del Lazio borders the following municipalities: Cassino, Cervaro, Conca Casale, Mignano Monte Lungo, Rocca d'Evandro, San Pietro Infine, Venafro, Viticuso.

References

Cities and towns in Lazio